Elin Maria Segerlind (born 1985) is a Swedish politician and former member of the Riksdag, the national legislature. A member of the Left Party, she represented Västra Götaland County North between September 2018 and September 2022.

Segerlind is the daughter of shop worker Dennis Segerlind and nurse Carina Segerlind. She was educated in Nödinge and studied literature and cultural studies at Umeå University. She studied journalism at a folk high school in Vara. She was a reported for Sveriges Radio between 2011 and 2013.

References

1985 births
Living people
Members of the Riksdag 2018–2022
Members of the Riksdag from the Left Party (Sweden)
Women members of the Riksdag
21st-century Swedish women politicians
Umeå University alumni